Dan Miller may refer to:
Dan John Miller, American singer-songwriter for Blanche
Dan Miller (American football) (born 1960), former American football kicker
Dan Miller (fighter) (born 1981), welterweight fighter in the Ultimate Fighting Championship
Dan Miller (Florida politician) (born 1942), former member of the U.S. Congress
Dan Miller (Pennsylvania politician) (born 1973), member of the Pennsylvania House of Representatives
Dan Miller (Canadian politician) (born 1944), politician in British Columbia
Dan Miller (guitarist) (born 1967), member of the backing band for They Might Be Giants, and formerly of Lincoln
Dan Miller (journalist) (1941–2009), anchorman for TV station WSMV in Nashville
Dan Miller (sportscaster) (born 1963), radio announcer for the Detroit Lions and Sports Director at WJBK in Detroit
Dan Miller, editor of Bluegrass Unlimited
Dan Miller, host of Top Card and 10 Seconds
Dan Miller (born 1980), singer from O-Town
Dan Miller, a character in "The Mist"
Dan Miller, a character in The Thick of It

See also
Daniel Miller (disambiguation)
Danny Miller (disambiguation)